The Royal Norwegian Ministry of Shipping was a Norwegian ministry that existed from 1942 to 1945.

It was established on 1 October 1942, during the second World War. Nortraship had been operating since 1940. The Ministry of Shipping ceased to exist on 5 November 1945. Its tasks were mainly transferred to the Ministry of Trade.

The heads of the Ministry of Shipping were Arne Sunde (1942-1945) and Tor Skjønsberg (1945). Also, Sven Nielsen was acting minister in 1945.

An unrelated Ministry of Trade and Shipping was formed in 1947.

References

Shipping
 Shipping
1945 disestablishments in Norway
Norway, Shipping
Shipping in Norway
Shipping ministries